The 2012 United States Senate election in Washington took place on November 6, 2012, concurrently with the 2012 U.S. presidential election as well as other elections to the United States Senate and House of Representatives and various state and local elections. Incumbent Democratic U.S. Senator Maria Cantwell won re-election to a third term by a significant margin, outperforming President Barack Obama's margin in the concurrent presidential election by 6%.

Background 
Maria Cantwell won re-election to serve a third term with 56.81% of the vote against Mike McGavick in the 2006 Washingtonian U.S. senatorial election.

Top-two primary election

Candidates

Democratic 
 Maria Cantwell, incumbent U.S. Senator
 Timothy Wilson

Republican 
 Michael Baumgartner, state senator
 Art Coday, physician
 Chuck Jackson, merchant mariner
 Glen R. Stockwell, president of Washington State Economic Development Corporation
 Mike the Mover, perennial candidate

Declined 
 Bill Bryant, Port of Seattle Commission President
 Clint Didier, former NFL football player (endorsed Coday)
 Doc Hastings, U.S. Representative
 Jaime Herrera Beutler, U.S. Representative
 John Koster, Snohomish County Councilman and candidate for the 2nd congressional district in 2010 (running for the U.S. House)
 Cathy McMorris Rodgers, U.S. Representative
 Dave Reichert, U.S. Representative
 Phillip Yin, Hong Kong-based anchor for Bloomberg Television

Others 
 Will Baker (Reform Party)

Results

General election

Candidates 
 Maria Cantwell (Democratic), incumbent U.S. Senator
 Michael Baumgartner (Republican), state senator

Debates 
Complete video of debate, October 12, 2012 - C-SPAN

Fundraising

Top contributors

Top industries

Predictions

Polling 
Aggregate polls

Endorsements

Results

By congressional district
Cantwell won 8 of 10 congressional districts with the remaining 2 going to Baumgartner.

See also 
 2012 United States Senate elections
 2012 United States House of Representatives elections in Washington
 2012 United States presidential election in Washington
 2012 Washington gubernatorial election

Notes

References

External links 
 Elections & Voting at the Washington Secretary of State office
 Campaign contributions at OpenSecrets.org
 Outside spending at Sunlight Foundation
 Candidate issue positions at On the Issues

Official campaign websites (Archived)
 Maria Cantwell
 Michael Baumgartner
 Art Coday

Washington
2012
2012 Washington (state) elections